Duncan Airport  is located adjacent to Duncan, British Columbia, Canada.

See also
 List of airports on Vancouver Island

References

External links
Page about this airport on COPA's Places to Fly airport directory

Registered aerodromes in British Columbia
Duncan, British Columbia